Vatter is a surname and can refer to:

 Javier Vatter (born 1990), Argentine footballer
 William J. Vatter (1905-1990), American accounting scholar